"Up on the Ridge" is a song co-written and recorded by American country music artist Dierks Bentley.  It was released on April 12, 2010 as the lead-off single and title track from his album of the same name.  The song peaked at number 21 on the US Billboard Hot Country Songs chart. Bentley wrote this song with Angelo Petraglia.

Content
The song is an uptempo bluegrass tune in which the narrator encourages his lover to leave the city behind with him for the night.

Critical reception
Sam Gazdziak of Engine 145 gave the song a "thumbs up" review, saying the song "coasts by on style over substance," but calling it "interesting." Country Weekly critic Jessica Phillips, in her review of the album, said that "the song's energetic spirit and banjo-supported melody should be a shot in the arm for country music."

Chart performance
The song debuted on the U.S. Billboard Hot Country Songs charts at #59 during the week of May 1, 2010. On the Hot Country Songs charts, the song peaked at #21, becoming his first single to miss the Top Ten since "My Last Name" reached #17 in 2004.

References

2010 singles
2010 songs
Dierks Bentley songs
Songs written by Dierks Bentley
Capitol Records Nashville singles
Songs written by Angelo Petraglia